Jamel Debbouze (born 18 June 1975) is a French-Moroccan actor, comedian, screenwriter, film producer and director. Best known for his stand-up comedy sketches, he also worked with director Alain Chabat in several films and other notable French humourists such as Florence Foresti, Fred Testot and Gad Elmaleh. He has starred in a number of box-office successes, including Amélie, Asterix & Obelix: Mission Cleopatra, Hollywoo and HOUBA! On the Trail of the Marsupilami. He is the founder of the Canal+ television show Jamel Comedy Club.

Life
Debbouze was born in Paris, France. His family, from Taza, moved back to Morocco the following year. They returned in 1979 and settled in Trappes in 1983, in the Paris region, where Debbouze spent the rest of his childhood. He is the eldest of six siblings: Jamel, Mohamed, Hayat, Karim, Rachid and Nawel Debbouze.

On 17 January 1990, at the train station in Trappes, he was struck by a passing train travelling at 150 km/h. He lost the use of his right arm in the accident, which killed another young man, Jean-Paul Admette, the son of the singer Michel Admette from Reunion. Debbouze was sued by the victim's family for manslaughter but the case was dismissed for lack of proof. In December 2004, he was going to perform on stage on the French island of Réunion, but Debbouze cancelled, claiming illness, as Michel Admette's parents had organized a demonstration against his arrival.

In 1995, he was spotted by the bosses of Radio Nova, Jacques Massadian and Jean-François Bizot, who made him famous (Massadian would become his manager). He debuted on Radio Nova, with a film review show, Le Cinéma de Jamel and on television around 1996–1997 on cable channel Paris Première, in a TV show co-produced by Radio Nova and the channel. He took Le Cinéma de Jamel to television on Canal+ in 1998. On the same channel, he contributed to another show, H, along with Éric Judor and Ramzy Bedia.

He acted in the movies Zonzon (1998), international box-office hit Amélie (2001), domestic hit Asterix & Obelix: Mission Cleopatra (2002), and Angel-A (2005, directed by Luc Besson).

In 2006, he acted in the historical movie Days of Glory (which he co-produced), paying tribute to the North-African soldiers who fought for France during the Second World War. For this movie, he got the prize for best male actor at the 59th edition of the Cannes Film Festival with Samy Naceri, Roschdy Zem, Sami Bouajila and Bernard Blancan.

In April 2008, Debbouze opened a comedy club, called Le Comedy Club, in Paris aimed at launching newcomers on the stand-up scene.

On 29 March 2008, Debbouze became engaged to French journalist and news anchor Mélissa Theuriau; the two married on 7 May 2008 and subsequently had two children.

In 2009, Debbouze collaborated with the rap band 113 and Awa Imani for the project Maghreb United of Rim'K'.

On 1 December 2010, Debbouze's new DVD named Made in Jamel featuring the likes of Gad Elmaleh, Florence Foresti, Élie Semoun, Stromae, Didier Bourdon, Youness Ait Benouissaden, Noureddine Oussayah and Sophie Mounicot was released.

His show, Jamel improvise, debuted in January 2011, before playing every evening's Tout sur Jamel from 1 to 20 January at the Casino de Paris.

He was the chairman of the 2013 César Awards.

Career

First works
In 1990, Debbouze met Alain Degois, an educator who organized theater improvisation workshops, and joined his troupe. With this troupe, he took part in the French Championship of Improvisation in 1991 and toured Quebec and Morocco. In 1992, he got his first part in a film called Les Pierres Bleues du Désert. After this film, Debbouze wanted to work as an actor and create his own show. This happened in 1995 with the show C'est Tout Neuf which had been enjoyed a lot. Then he had an approximative role on the radio program Radio Nova and took part in the television program Nova Premiere where he was noticed by Canal+.

Debbouze's various shows
In 1998, Debbouze played Jamel Dridi, an operator, in the hospital sitcom, H on Canal+, alongside fellow comedians Eric and Ramzy. By the time the series ended in 2002, Debbouze had achieved national fame.

In March 1999, Debbouze started his new show Jamel en Scène. In this show, Debbouze talked about his beginnings, his childhood and show business. The show played at La Cigale and then at the Bataclan in Paris. He went on tour throughout France in 2000. At the end of the year, he returned to Paris with his show at the Olympia for three weeks.

In 2002, Debbouze returned with a new show, 100% Debbouze. For three years this show played in the top Parisian theaters: the Casino de Paris, the Bataclan, Le Zénith, and the Olympia. He then toured France, Morocco, Tunisia, Switzerland, and Belgium. The DVD of the show went on sale in 2004, and sold more than 1 million copies.

In 2006, Debbouze became the presenter of a new program, Jamel Comedy Club, which featured a half-hour of the new generation of French humorists each week. With this troupe, Debbouze went to the Casino de Paris in 2007 for a new show, Le Jamel Comedy Club Envahit le Casino de Paris. This show was very successful, its run was extended and it also played in Canada.

Cinematic works 

In 1992, the seventeen-year-old Debbouze appeared in his first film, Les Pierres Bleues du Désert. The film tells the story of a young boy who is persecuted because he believes in the existence of blue stones in the desert. It was the first of numerous film roles for Debbouze. In 1996, he played a small part in Les Deux papas et la maman, a film by Jean-Marc Doval with Smaïn and Arielle Dombasle. Three years later he received his first big role in a feature film called Le Ciel les oiseaux et ta ... mère! (Boys on the Beach). This comedy was successful, with more than one million tickets sold. Over the next two years he continued his stage shows, before returning to film with the highly successful Le fabuleux destin d'Amélie Poulain. He was nominated for his part in this film for the César Award for Best Supporting Actor in 2002. In 2002, Debbouze appeared in another big French film, Asterix & Obelix: Mission Cleopatra directed by Alain Chabat. This successful film was seen by 14,000,000 spectators. In 2005, he had the leading role in Luc Besson's film Angel-A.

In 2006, Debbouze played one of the most important parts of his career in the film Indigènes (Days of Glory in the United States). The film told the story of four North African soldiers who participate in the liberation of France during World War II. Debbouze, Samy Naceri, Sami Bouajila and Roschdy Zem shared the prize for the best male performance at the 2006 Cannes Film Festival.

Television work 
In 1996, he took part for the first time in a TV show called Nova première on Paris Première. He was noticed on this show by some producers from Canal+ who hired him to present a show called Le cinéma de Jamel. For New Year's Eve in 2000, Debbouze created a TV show for this occasion called the Jamel show. Numerous French comedians such as Bruno Solo, Alain Chabat, Élie Semoun, and Dieudonné appeared in this show. In April 2003, he took part in 6 commercials for Orangina.

Personal life 
On 29 March 2008, he was engaged to French journalist Mélissa Theuriau; the two were married on 7 May 2008. They had a son on 3 December 2008 named Léon and a daughter named Lila in 2011.

Filmography

Shows

References

External links 

 Official site
 

1975 births
Living people
Male actors from Paris
French male film actors
French male television actors
French stand-up comedians
French humorists
French people of Moroccan descent
Moroccan male film actors
Moroccan male television actors
Moroccan comedians
People from Trappes
Arabs in France
20th-century Moroccan male actors
21st-century Moroccan male actors
20th-century French male actors
21st-century French male actors
French film directors
French male screenwriters
French screenwriters
French film producers
Cannes Film Festival Award for Best Actor winners